This is a list of settlements in Chios regional unit in Greece:

 Agio Gala
 Agios Georgios Sykousis
 Amades
 Anavatos
 Armolia
 Avgonyma
 Chalandra
 Chalkeio
 Chios (town)
 Dafnonas
 Diefcha
 Elata
 Exo Didyma
 Flatsia
 Fyta
 Kalamoti
 Kallimasia
 Kampia
 Kardamyla
 Karfas
 Karyes
 Katarraktis
 Keramos
 Koini
 Kourounia
 Lagkada
 Leptopoda
 Lithi
 Melanios
 Mesa Didyma
 Mesta
 Myrmigki
 Nea Potamia
 Nenita
 Nenitouria
 Neochori
 Oinousses
 Olympoi
 Pagida
 Parparia
 Patrika
 Pirama
 Pispilounta
 Pityous
 Psara
 Pyrgi
 Sidirounta
 Spartounta
 Sykiada
 Tholopotami
 Thymiana
 Trypes
 Vasileonoiko
 Vaviloi
 Ververato
 Vessa
 Viki
 Volissos
 Vouno
 Vrontados
 Zyfias

See also

List of towns and villages in Greece

 
Chios